Chromium dioxide or chromium(IV) oxide is an inorganic compound with the formula CrO2.  It is a black synthetic magnetic solid.  It once was widely used in magnetic tape emulsion. With the increasing popularity of CDs and DVDs, the use of chromium(IV) oxide has declined. However, it is still used in data tape applications for enterprise-class storage systems. It is still considered by many oxide and tape manufacturers to have been one of the best magnetic recording particulates ever invented.

Preparation and basic properties
CrO2 was first prepared by Friedrich Wöhler by decomposition of chromyl chloride. The balanced equation for the hydrothermal synthesis is:
3 CrO3  +  Cr2O3   →   5 CrO2  +  O2

The magnetic crystal that forms is a long, slender glass-like rod — perfect as a magnetic pigment for recording tape. When commercialized in the late 1960s as a recording medium, DuPont assigned it the tradename of Magtrieve.

CrO2 adopts the rutile structure (as do many metal dioxides).  As such, each Cr(IV) center has octahedral coordination geometry and each oxide is trigonal planar.

Uses

The crystal's magnetic properties, derived from its ideal shape such as anisotropy which imparted high coercivity and remanent magnetization intensities, resulted in exceptional stability and efficiency for short wavelengths, and it almost immediately appeared in high performance audio tape used in audio cassettes for which treble response and hiss were always problems. Unlike the imperfectly formed ferric oxide coating commonly used, the chromium dioxide crystals were perfectly formed and could be evenly and densely dispersed in a magnetic coating leading to higher signal-to-noise ratios in audio recordings. Chrome tapes did, however, require audio cassette recorders to be equipped with a higher-bias current capability (roughly 50% greater) than that used by ferric oxide to properly magnetize the tape particles. Also introduced was a new equalization (70 μs) that traded some of the extended high-frequency response for lower noise, resulting in a 5–6 dB improvement in signal-to-noise ratio over ferric oxide audio tapes. These bias and EQ settings were later carried over to "chrome-equivalent" cobalt-modified tapes introduced in the mid-1970s by TDK, Maxell, and others. Later research significantly increased the coercivity of the particle by doping or adsorbing rare elements such as iridium onto the crystal matrix or by improving the axial length-to-deprecated ratios. The resulting product was potentially a competitor to metallic iron pigments but apparently achieved little market penetration.

Problems
Until manufacturers developed new ways to mill the oxide, the crystals could easily be broken in the manufacturing process, and this led to excessive print-through (echo). Output from a tape could drop about 1 dB or so in a year's time. Although the decrease was uniform across the frequency range and noise also dropped the same amount, preserving the dynamic range, the decrease misaligned Dolby noise reduction decoders that were sensitive to level settings. The chrome coating was harder than competitive coatings, and that led to accusations of excessive head wear. Although the tape initially wore hard ferrite heads faster than oxide-based tapes, it actually wore softer permalloy heads at a slower rate; and head wear was more a problem for permalloy heads than for ferrite heads. After 500 hours of running across ferrite heads, chrome tape had polished the granular surface enough that there was no more detectable wear, and the gap edges remained sharp and distinct. The head wear scare and licensing issues with DuPont kept blank consumer chrome tapes at a great disadvantage versus the eventually more popular Type II tapes that used cobalt-modified iron oxide, but chrome was the tape of choice for the music industry's cassette releases.

Producers
DuPont licensed the product to Sony in Japan and BASF in Germany in the early 1970s for regional production and distribution. Japanese competitors  developed cobalt-adsorbed (TDK: Avilyn) and cobalt ferrite (Maxell: Epitaxial) "chrome equivalent" Type II audio cassettes and various videotape formats as substitutes. Added to that was the problem that the production of CrO2 yielded toxic by-products of which Japanese manufacturers had great difficulty properly disposing. BASF eventually became the largest producer of both the chromium dioxide pigment and chrome tapes, basing its VHS & S-VHS video tape, audio cassettes, and 3480 data cartridges on this formulation. DuPont and BASF had also introduced chrome-cobalt "blended" oxide pigments which combined about 70% cobalt-modified iron oxide with 30% chrome oxide into a single coating, presumably to offer improved performance at lower costs than pure chrome. Many high-grade VHS tapes also used much smaller amounts of chrome in their formulations because its magnetic properties combined with its cleaning effects on heads made it a better choice than aluminium oxide or other non-magnetic materials added to VHS tape to keep heads clean. DuPont discontinued its production of chromium dioxide particles in the 1990s. In addition to BASF, which no longer owns a tape manufacturing division, Bayer AG of Germany, Toda Kogyo and Sakai Chemical of Japan also do or can produce the magnetic particles for commercial applications.

References

Further reading

 O'Kelly, Terence (1981). "The Technical Argument for Chromium Dioxide." The BASF Inventor's Notebook Number 6;  http://www.ant-audio.co.uk/Tape_Recording/Library/Chrome.pdf

Chromium–oxygen compounds
Audio engineering
Transition metal oxides
Ferromagnetic materials
Chromium(IV) compounds